European Film Award - Prix Fipresci:

Nominees and winners

1990s

2000s

External links
European Film Academy archive

Prix Fipresci